The 1988 Women's World Chess Championship was won by Maia Chiburdanidze, who successfully defended her title against challenger Nana Ioseliani.

1987 Interzonals

As part of the qualification process, two Interzonal tournaments were held in the summer of 1987, one in Smederevska Palanka in July and the other in Tuzla in July and August, featuring the best players from each FIDE zone. A total of 34 players took part, with the top three from each Interzonal qualifying for the Candidates Tournament.

Litinskaya-Shul won in Smederevska Palanka, while three players shared second place. They then contested a playoff in Tbilisi in September, which was won by ex-champion Gaprindashvili (3/4 points) ahead of ex-challenger Levitina (2½/4), while Klimova-Richtrova (½/4) was eliminated.

Ioseliani and Arakhamia took first and second place in Tuzla, while Brustman clinched the last spot in the Candidates after winning a playoff against Semenova 4-1.

{| class="wikitable"
|+ 1987 Women's Interzonal, Smederevska Palanka
|-
! !! Player !! 1 !! 2 !! 3 !! 4 !! 5 !! 6 !! 7 !! 8 !! 9 !! 10 !! 11 !! 12 !! 13 !! 14 !! 15 !! 16 !! Points !! Tie break
|- style="background:#ccffcc;"
| 1 ||  || - || ½ || 0 || 1 || 1 || 1 || 1 || ½ || 0 || 0 || 1 || 1 || 1 || 1 || 1 || 1 || 11 || 
|- style="background:#ccffcc;"
| 2 ||  || ½ || - || ½ || 0 || 1 || 1 || ½ || 0 || 1 || ½ || ½ || 1 || 1 || 1 || 1 || 1 || 10½ || 68.50
|- style="background:#ccffcc;"
| 3 ||  || 1 || ½ || - || ½ || ½ || ½ || ½ || 0 || ½ || ½ || 1 || 1 || 1 || 1 || 1 || 1 || 10½ || 67.75
|-
| 4 ||  || 0 || 1 || ½ || - || ½ || 0 || ½ || 0 || 1 || 1 || 1 || 1 || 1 || 1 || 1 || 1 || 10½ || 65.00
|-
| 5 ||  || 0 || 0 || ½ || ½ || - || 1 || 1 || ½ || 0 || 1 || 1 || ½ || 1 || 1 || 1 || 1 || 10 || 
|-
| 6 ||  || 0 || 0 || ½ || 1 || 0 || - || 1 || 1 || ½ || 1 || ½ || 1 || 0 || 1 || 1 || 1 || 9½ || 61.50
|-
| 7 ||  || 0 || ½ || ½ || ½ || 0 || 0 || - || ½ || ½ || 1 || 1 || 1 || 1 || 1 || 1 || 1 || 9½ || 55.25
|-
| 8 ||  || ½ || 1 || 1 || 1 || ½ || 0 || ½ || - || 0 || ½ || 0 || 1 || 1 || 1 || ½ || ½ || 9 || 66.50
|-
| 9 ||  || 1 || 0 || ½ || 0 || 1 || ½ || ½ || 1 || - || 0 || 1 || ½ || ½ || ½ || 1 || 1 || 9 || 61.50
|-
| 10 ||  || 1 || ½ || ½ || 0 || 0 || 0 || 0 || ½ || 1 || - || 1 || ½ || ½ || 0 || 0 || 1 || 6½ || 
|-
| 11 ||  || 0 || ½ || 0 || 0 || 0 || ½ || 0 || 1 || 0 || 0 || - || 0 || ½ || 1 || 1 || 1 || 5½ || 29.50
|-
| 12 ||  || 0 || 0 || 0 || 0 || ½ || 0 || 0 || 0 || ½ || ½ || 1 || - || 1 || ½ || ½ || 1 || 5½ || 28.50
|-
| 13 ||  || 0 || 0 || 0 || 0 || 0 || 1 || 0 || 0 || ½ || ½ || ½ || 0 || - || ½ || 1 || 1 || 5 || 
|-
| 14 ||  || 0 || 0 || 0 || 0 || 0 || 0 || 0 || 0 || ½ || 1 || 0 || ½ || ½ || - || ½ || 1 || 4 || 
|-
| 15 ||  || 0 || 0 || 0 || 0 || 0 || 0 || 0 || ½ || 0 || 1 || 0 || ½ || 0 || ½ || - || 0 || 2½ || 
|-
| 16 ||  || 0 || 0 || 0 || 0 || 0 || 0 || 0 || ½ || 0 || 0 || 0 || 0 || 0 || 0 || 1 || - || 1½ || 
|}

{| class="wikitable"
|+ 1987 Women's Interzonal, Tuzla
|-
! !! Player !! 1 !! 2 !! 3 !! 4 !! 5 !! 6 !! 7 !! 8 !! 9 !! 10 !! 11 !! 12 !! 13 !! 14 !! 15 !! 16 !! 17 !! 18 !! Points !! Tie break
|- style="background:#ccffcc;"
| 1 ||  || - || 1 || ½ || ½ || ½ || ½ || ½ || ½ || 1 || 1 || 1 || 1 || ½ || ½ || 1 || 1 || 1 || 1 || 13 || 
|- style="background:#ccffcc;"
| 2 ||  || 0 || - || 0 || 0 || 1 || 0 || 1 || 1 || 0 || 1 || 1 || 1 || 1 || 1 || 1 || 1 || 1 || 1 || 12 || 
|-
| 3 ||  || ½ || 1 || - || ½ || ½ || 1 || 1 || 1 || ½ || 0 || 0 || ½ || 1 || 1 || 0 || 1 || 1 || 1 || 11½ || 93.75
|- style="background:#ccffcc;"
| 4 ||  || ½ || 1 || ½ || - || 1 || ½ || ½ || 1 || ½ || ½ || 0 || ½ || 0 || 1 || 1 || 1 || 1 || 1 || 11½ || 92.25
|-
| 5 ||  || ½ || 0 || ½ || 0 || - || 1 || ½ || ½ || 1 || 0 || 1 || 1 || ½ || 0 || 1 || 1 || 1 || 1 || 10½ || 
|-
| 6 ||  || ½ || 1 || 0 || ½ || 0 || - || 1 || ½ || 1 || ½ || 1 || ½ || 1 || ½ || 0 || 1 || 0 || 1 || 10 || 82.25
|-
| 7 ||  || ½ || 0 || 0 || ½ || ½ || 0 || - || 0 || 1 || 1 || 1 || 1 || ½ || 1 || 1 || 0 || 1 || 1 || 10 || 73.50
|-
| 8 ||  || ½ || 0 || 0 || 0 || ½ || ½ || 1 || - || ½ || 1 || ½ || 1 || ½ || 0 || ½ || ½ || 1 || 1 || 9 || 67.50
|-
| 9 ||  || 0 || 1 || ½ || ½ || 0 || 0 || 0 || ½ || - || ½ || ½ || 0 || 1 || 1 || 1 || ½ || 1 || 1 || 9 || 66.00
|-
| 10 ||  || 0 || 0 || 1 || ½ || 1 || ½ || 0 || 0 || ½ || - || 1 || 1 || ½ || ½ || ½ || 0 || ½ || 1 || 8½ || 
|-
| 11 ||  || 0 || 0 || 1 || 1 || 0 || 0 || 0 || ½ || ½ || 0 || - || ½ || 1 || 0 || 1 || 1 || 0 || 1 || 7½ || 57.25
|-
| 12 ||  || 0 || 0 || ½ || ½ || 0 || ½ || 0 || 0 || 1 || 0 || ½ || - || 0 || 1 || ½ || 1 || 1 || 1 || 7½ || 52.25
|-
| 13 ||  || ½ || 0 || 0 || 1 || ½ || 0 || ½ || ½ || 0 || ½ || 0 || 1 || - || ½ || ½ || ½ || ½ || ½ || 7 || 57.50
|-
| 14 ||  || ½ || 0 || 0 || 0 || 1 || ½ || 0 || 1 || 0 || ½ || 1 || 0 || ½ || - || 0 || ½ || ½ || 1 || 7 || 54.00
|-
| 15 ||  || 0 || 0 || 1 || 0 || 0 || 1 || 0 || ½ || 0 || ½ || 0 || ½ || ½ || 1 || - || 0 || 1 || 0 || 6 || 49.00
|-
| 16 ||  || 0 || 0 || 0 || 0 || 0 || 0 || 1 || ½ || ½ || 1 || 0 || 0 || ½ || ½ || 1 || - || ½ || ½ || 6 || 44.00
|-
| 17 ||  || 0 || 0 || 0 || 0 || 0 || 1 || 0 || 0 || 0 || ½ || 1 || 0 || ½ || ½ || 0 || ½ || - || ½ || 4½ || 
|-
| 18 ||  || 0 || 0 || 0 || 0 || 0 || 0 || 0 || 0 || 0 || 0 || 0 || 0 || ½ || 0 || 1 || ½ || ½ || - || 2½ || 
|}

1988 Candidates Tournament

The six qualifiers from the Interzonals were joined by the top two from the previous Candidates: Akhmilovskaya and Alexandria.

Like the previous cycle, the Candidates Tournament in this cycle was contested as a double round-robin tournament in Tsqaltubo in January 1988. Isoseliani and Akhmilovskaya (the challenger from the previous cycle) tied for first place, but Ioseliani won the subsequent playoff 3-2, earning the right to challenge the reigning champion for the title.

{| class="wikitable"
|+ 1988 Women's Candidates Tournament
|-
! !! Player !! Rating !! 1 !! 2 !! 3 !! 4 !! 5 !! 6 !! 7 !! 8 !! Points !! Tie break
|- style="background:#ccffcc;"
| 1 ||  || 2455 || - || 1½ || ½ || 1½ || 1 || 2 || 1½ || 2 || 10 || 62.25
|-
| 2 ||  || 2400 || ½ || - || 1½ || 1½ || 1½ || 2 || 2 || 1 || 10 || 62.25
|-
| 3 ||  || 2355 || 1½ || ½ || - || ½ || 1½ || 1 || 1½ || 1½ || 8 || 51.25
|-
| 4 ||  || 2415 || ½ || ½ || 1½ || - || 1 || 1 || 1½ || 2 || 8 || 47.75
|-
| 5 ||  || 2415 || 1 || ½ || ½ || 1 || - || 1 || 1 || 1½ || 6½ || 
|-
| 6 ||  || 2395 || 0 || 0 || 1 || 1 || 1 || - || 1 || 1½ || 5½ || 
|-
| 7 ||  || 2485 || ½ || 0 || ½ || ½ || 1 || 1 || - || 1 || 4½ || 
|-
| 8 ||  || 2420 || 0 || 1 || ½ || 0 || ½ || ½ || 1 || - || 3½ || 
|}

1988 Championship Match

The championship match was played in Telavi in 1988. This time, challenger Ioseliani put real pressure on the champion, especially when she won the penultimate game, reducing Chiburdanidze's lead to one point. In the end, however, the champion forced a draw with Black in the last game and held onto her title (in what would turn out to be her last successful defense).

{| class="wikitable" style="text-align:center"
|+Women's World Championship Match 1988
|-
! !! 1 !! 2 !! 3 !! 4 !! 5 !! 6 !! 7 !! 8 !! 9 !! 10 !! 11 !! 12 !! 13 !! 14 !! 15 !! 16 !! Total
|-
| align=left | 
| ½ ||style="background:black; color:white"| 1 || ½ ||style="background:black; color:white"| 0 || ½ ||style="background:black; color:white"| ½ || 1 ||style="background:black; color:white"| ½ || ½ ||style="background:black; color:white"| ½ || 1 ||style="background:black; color:white"| ½ || ½ ||style="background:black; color:white"| ½ || 0 ||style="background:black; color:white"| ½ || 8½
|-
| align=left | 
|style="background:black; color:white"| ½ || 0 ||style="background:black; color:white"| ½ || 1 ||style="background:black; color:white"| ½ || ½ ||style="background:black; color:white"| 0 || ½ ||style="background:black; color:white"| ½ || ½ ||style="background:black; color:white"| 0 || ½ ||style="background:black; color:white"| ½ || ½ ||style="background:black; color:white"| 1 || ½ || 7½
|}

References

Women's World Chess Championships
1988 in chess
1988 in Israeli sport